"King of the Rodeo" is the third single taken from Kings of Leon's second album, Aha Shake Heartbreak. It was released in April 2005 and charted at number 41 on the UK Singles Chart.

Track listings
All songs were written by Kings of Leon except where noted.

CD single
 "King of the Rodeo" – 2:25
 "Taper Jean Girl" (live in Belgium) – 3:13
 "Molly's Chambers" (live in Belgium) (Caleb Followill, Nathan Followill, Angelo Petraglia) - 2:40
 "King of the Rodeo" (video) - 3:10

7-inch vinyl
 "King of the Rodeo" – 2:25
 "Soft" – 3:02

Covers
The song has been covered by the Bamboos with Megan Washington.

References

External links
 

Kings of Leon songs
2004 singles
2004 songs